Park Jong-won is a Korean name consisting of the family name Park and the given name Jong-won. It may refer to:

 Park Jong-won (director) (born 1960), South Korean film director and screenwriter
 Park Jong-won (footballer) (born 1955), South Korean footballer